Paul Kater is a Dutch author and novelist, writing novels in the fantasy and steampunk genres.

Kater developed a feel for languages, but chose to write instead due to the lack of outlets for working with the Dutch language. He has authored several books since 2003, all in English to allow for international recognition and consumption. Since January 2012, Kater has been a member-publisher of the Alexandria Publishing Group.

Kater currently resides in Cuijk, Netherlands.

Works

Hilda the Wicked Witch
Hilda the Wicked Witch
Hilda – Snow White revisited
Hilda – The Challenge
Hilda and Zelda
Hilda – Cats
Hilda – Back to school
Hilda – Dragon Master
Hilda – Aiaia

Steampunk books
Aeroparts factory
Lily Marin – Three short steampunk stories
Lily Marin – Three short steampunk stories, Book 2
Bactine

Other works
The Devil's Diary

References

External links

Paul Kater's page on the Alexandria Publishing Group website
Profile on Smashwords (digital publication of Paul's works)

1960 births
Living people
Dutch fantasy writers